Puligny-Montrachet is a commune in the Côte-d'Or department in eastern France.

In the middle of the Côte de Beaune, it is a well-known appellation of Burgundy wine, containing one of the most famous vineyards in the world, Montrachet.

Population

Wine

The "Scabby Hill" ("Mont Rachaz"), not much more than an undulation between the villages of Puligny and Chassagne, is one of the most famous vineyard sites in the world. As with other Burgundy villages, both Puligny and Chassagne now officially append the name of their most famous vineyard to their own names.  Wines from the Chassagne side are called "Le Montrachet" and from the Puligny side simply "Montrachet" - there are 4 hectares of each. Above Montrachet proper is the 7.59ha of Chevalier Montrachet (all in Puligny), at the bottom of the slope lies Bâtard Montrachet (6.02ha in Puligny). The names of these two Grand Crus supposedly reflect the division of the estate of the Seigneur de Montrachet between his two sons, one of whom had been a knight in the Crusades, the other was illegitimate. Puligny also contains the Grand Cru of Bienvenues-Bâtard-Montrachet (3.69ha).[2]

There are also 100ha of Premier Cru vineyards out of the total of 235ha in Puligny.  Technically there are 24 Premier Crus, although 10 of them represent particular plots within other Premier Crus. While the complex, minerally white wines get all the attention, there are 6.4ha of Pinot Noir.

See also
Communes of the Côte-d'Or department
French wine
Burgundy wine
Côte de Beaune

References

Further reading
 Coates, Clive (1997) Côte D'Or: A Celebration of the Great Wines of Burgundy Weidenfeld Nicolson

External links

 thewinedoctor.com A great overview of the geography and wines of Burgundy
 Details of the vineyards within the Côte de Beaune.
 www.netbourgogne.com
 The Burgundy Report Good descriptions of the vineyards and vintages.

Communes of Côte-d'Or